Sun moth may refer to several families of moths:

Acanthopteroctetidae
Castniidae
Heliodinidae